is a district located in Hyōgo Prefecture, Japan.  As of 2003, the district has an estimated population of 29,053 and a density of 321.35 persons per km2. The total area is 90.41 km2.

Towns and villages
Inagawa

Districts in Hyōgo Prefecture